Marion Township is one of sixteen townships in Franklin County, Iowa, United States.  As of the 2010 census, its population was 1,030 and it contained 464 housing units.

History
Marion Township was organized in 1874.

Geography

Cities, towns, villages
 Coulter (northeast half)
 Latimer

Unincorporated towns
 Washington at 
(This list is based on USGS data and may include former settlements.)

Cemeteries
The township contains Coulter Cemetery, Marion Center Cemetery and Saint Pauls Evangelical Lutheran Cemetery.

Transportation
 Interstate 35
 Iowa Highway 3

School districts
 Cal Community School District
 Hampton-Dumont Community School District
 West Fork Community School District

Political districts
 Iowa's 4th congressional district
 State House District 54
 State Senate District 27

References

External links
 City-Data.com

Townships in Iowa
Townships in Franklin County, Iowa
Populated places established in 1874
1874 establishments in Iowa